Ahmad Jamal at the Top: Poinciana Revisited is a live album by American jazz pianist Ahmad Jamal featuring performances recorded at The Village Gate in 1968 and released on the Impulse! label.

Critical reception
Thom Jurek of Allmusic states the album "reveals Jamal playing in a more driving, percussive style, though he keeps his utterly elegant chord voicings intact".

Track listing
All compositions by Ahmad Jamal except where noted.
 "Have You Met Miss Jones" (Lorenz Hart, Richard Rodgers) – 3:47 
 "Poinciana" (Buddy Bernier, Nat Simon) – 9:19 
 "Lament" – 8:05 
 "Call Me" (Tony Hatch) – 4:51 
 "(Theme from) Valley of the Dolls" (André Previn, Dory Previn) – 4:23 
 "Frank's Tune" (Frank Strozier) – 5:50 
 "How Insensitive" (Antônio Carlos Jobim, Vinícius de Moraes) – 5:52

Personnel
Ahmad Jamal – piano
Jamil Sulieman – bass
Frank Gant – drums

References 

Impulse! Records live albums
Ahmad Jamal live albums
1969 live albums
Albums produced by Johnny Pate